Aymet Uzcátegui (born 1 December 1995) is a Venezuelan tennis player.

She has won five doubles titles on the ITF Women's Circuit, and made her debut for the Venezuela Fed Cup team in 2015, currently holding an 8–8 win–loss record. Aymet has been ranked as high as 601 in singles and 195 in doubles.

ITF finals: 10 (5–5)

Singles: 1 (0–1)

Doubles: 9 (5–4)

External links
 
  
 

1995 births
Living people
Venezuelan female tennis players
South American Games gold medalists for Venezuela
South American Games medalists in tennis
Competitors at the 2018 South American Games
Central American and Caribbean Games medalists in tennis
Central American and Caribbean Games silver medalists for Venezuela
20th-century Venezuelan women
21st-century Venezuelan women